This Year Jerusalem is an Australian documentary film about Israel directed by Terry Turle.

The film was successfully screened at the Art Deco Palais Theatre in St Kilda, Melbourne. This inspired a number of other Australian filmmakers to hire theatres and screen their own movies.

References

External links
Complete film at YouTube
This Year Jerusalem at British Film Institute

Australian documentary films